Robert the Bruce is a 2019 British historical fiction war film directed by Richard Gray concerning the renowned king of the same name. A character-driven ensemble piece, it portrays Robert's relationship with a peasant family as a galvanising influence on his struggle for independence and his ensuing reign.

Premise
Following a series of military losses, with his army in tatters and the success of his rebellion in doubt, Robert retreats from the battlefield. Alone, injured, and pursued by fortune-seekers intent on collecting a bounty placed on his head by King Edward I of England, he finds refuge in the croft of a peasant woman and the three children in her care: a teenage nephew, a young niece, and her own son. They care for him, forging a powerful bond, even though their clan is aligned with England. This connection inspires Robert with a deeper understanding of the patriotism of ordinary Scots, which drives his passionate return to the national stage and, ultimately, to victory and freedom.

Plot

In 1306, a truce meeting between Robert the Bruce and John Comyn is held in a chapel to discuss peace between their clans. Comyn has offered to give up his claim to the throne of Scotland and support Robert in exchange for land and money. Robert confronts Comyn, whom he knows is planning to betray him to the English, about his treachery, revealing that he knew all along that Comyn intended to betray him to the English instead of honouring their deal, and kills Comyn in a duel. The guards outside, hearing the commotion, immediately turn on each other and begin fighting as well, led by Robert's loyal vassal, John Douglas.

In the winter of 1313, Robert leads a handful of men—all that is left of his army—into the woods where they camp. Douglas tells Hamish, a teenage boy, about how Robert will not give up and will lead them to victory, only for Robert to interrupt him and say that his war is over and to return home. Three soldiers, disheartened by the war and upset by Robert's words, decide that rather than go home empty handed, they will try to capture Robert and turn him in for the bounty. Will, a hotheaded, somewhat cruel soldier, at first suggests killing Robert, but an older soldier states that it would be a mortal sin to kill a king. Robert leaves, followed at a distance by Hamish and John Douglas. While fishing, Douglas and Hamish are overtaken by Will and the other soldiers. They state their plan to turn against Robert and ask Douglas to join them; Douglas refuses, calling them traitors. A fight ensues, with Hamish being killed by Will when he tries to intervene and Douglas being seriously wounded and left for dead. The three soldiers press on into the woods in pursuit of Robert.

Meanwhile, in a mountain cottage, Morag Macfie, a widowed peasant farmer, relates to her son, Scot, her niece, Iver, and her nephew, Carney the story of how Robert defeated and killed Comyn. Scot expresses a strong dislike for Robert the Bruce, as his father died fighting for him. Later, Scot and Morag visit his father's grave and place flowers there. Scot observes Robert traveling through the woods briefly, but does not approach him. He tells his mother about it, but she doesn't believe him. The three soldiers, led by Will, soon catch up to Robert and attack him. He manages to kill two of them before being seriously wounded by Will; he manages to deal a crippling stroke to Will, but loses his sword in the process, and flees, finding refuge in a nearby cave under a stream bank. Will attempts to pursue him, but is slowed by his injury. Just then, a party of soldiers led by the local Sheriff, Brandubh, come across Will. He tells them of how he has wounded Robert the Bruce and promises to lead them to where they fought in exchange for a share of the reward money. Will keeps his word, and Brandubh finds Robert's sword, recognising that Will is telling the truth. He then kills Will to keep him quiet and swears all his men to secrecy. He begins searching for Robert, calling aloud for him, pretending to be a friend trying to find and help him, but Robert is not fooled. Brandubh then rides to Morag's croft and drops Robert's sword off with Carney, who is an apprentice blacksmith, for repairs. Carney takes the sword to his master, Sean, who helps him repair it. While there, Carney is greeted with affection by the blacksmith's teenage daughter, Briana, and they briefly kiss.

Later, while hunting, Scot, Iver and Carney find the unconscious Robert the Bruce, who has managed to leave the cave only to have his injuries catch up with him. Robert is brought back to Morag's house, where she resolves to hide him and tend his wounds until they heal, despite the fact that her clan has sided with the English in the ongoing war. Over the winter, Robert is nursed back to health and becomes a part of the family, apologising to Scot about the death of his father; teaching Carney the use of the sword; and becoming close to Morag. He resolves that the sacrifice of families like this one must not be for nothing and decides that he will continue fighting. One night, one of Brandubh's men sees Robert in Morag's house through the window and reports it to Brandubh. Brandubh gathers his men and rides for Morag's croft, but Briana overhears their plans and, worried about Carney, goes to Morag's house in the night to warn them. Forewarned, Robert plans with the others on how to fight Brandubh when they arrive.

The next morning, Iver and Scot take to the trees in the woods surrounding the croft and wait with their bows ready while Carney works in the yard with a sword hidden on him and Briana lies in wait in the barn. Brandubh rides onto the farm, confident that Morag and her family pose no threat to him. When Morag's attempt at deception fails, he strikes her and Robert comes out of the house and confronts him, ordering him as King of Scotland not to touch Morag or her family as they are under his protection. One of Brandubh's men agrees, but the rest do not and they draw their weapons. Now with the odds better, a fight ensues. Iver is able to kill several men with arrows, Scot manages to kill one as well, and Briana faces off with a sword against one of the soldiers while Carney and Robert fight others, Robert fighting Brandubh. Carney manages to kill his opponent just as Briana is overwhelmed and stabbed several times with a dagger. Enraged, Carney slashes her attacker's throat, and then sits weeping over her body. Iver and Scot manage to finish the other opponents, except for one who is killed as he is about to attack Carney with a thrown axe in the back by the soldier who switched sides, who then dies to an arrow Scot accidentally hit him with earlier. Brandubh and Robert fight inside the house, where Robert is saved by Morag, who clubs Brandubh to death with a piece of wood just as he is about to deliver the deathblow. Later, Robert and the family head into the woods after praying over Briana's grave. Robert leads them to the fortress of Angus McDonald, a friend, and claims Morag, Scot, Iver, and Carney as his own family before declaring he will continue to fight for Scotland. James Douglas is waiting for him and informs him they never doubted he would come back.

Years later, Morag kneels beside the grave of Scot, who died fighting for Robert at the Battle of Bannockburn in 1314, where Scotland finally won their freedom.

Cast
 Angus Macfadyen as Robert the Bruce
 Jared Harris as John Comyn
 Anna Hutchison as Morag
 Patrick Fugit as Will
 Zach McGowan as Brandubh
 Gabriel Bateman as Scot
 Talitha Bateman as Iver
 Emma Kenney as Briana
 Shane Coffey as Finley
 Kevin McNally as Seán
 Melora Walters as Ylfa
 Diarmaid Murtagh as James Douglas
 Daniel Portman as Aonghus Óg of Islay
 Brandon Lessard as Carney

Production
The film was announced in February 2018, with Angus Macfadyen reprising his role from Braveheart (1995). Jared Harris, Anna Hutchison and Patrick Fugit were also cast amongst others.

Filming had begun by February 2019.

In order to film the harsh winters which existed in Scotland during these times, the crew used the snow-covered hills lining the Yellowstone River (Paradise) Valley, south of Livingston, Montana, for those needed shots.

Release
The world premiere of Robert the Bruce took place at the Edinburgh Film Festival on 23 June 2019. It was released in the United Kingdom on 28 June 2019.
Signature Entertainment released the official theatrical trailer for the UK on 7 June 2019.

The film was scheduled to be released in the United States with a premiere screening by Fathom Events for one-night-only on 16 April 2020 with a limited theatrical release on 24 April 2020 by Screen Media Films, to coincide with the 700th anniversary of the Declaration of Arbroath. However, due to the COVID-19 pandemic, Fathom Events cancelled the premiere and limited release. Braveheart was also scheduled for a theatrical re-release by Fathom Events in March 2020 for its 25th anniversary and in promotion for Robert the Bruce, but it was also cancelled.

Home media
Signature Entertainment released the film in the United Kingdom, on DVD and Blu-ray disc, on 4 November 2019. The sole extra feature is an
audio commentary with director Richard Gray and co-writer and star Angus Macfadyen. Screen Media Films released the film in the United States on DVD only on 2 June 2020.

Reception

Box office
Robert the Bruce grossed £19,026 in the United Kingdom on its opening weekend (28/06/19) and £98,691 for its UK theatrical run.
$TBD in other territories, for a total worldwide gross of £98,691.

Critical response
The website's critics consensus reads: "It's inspired by epic real-life events, but rich cinematography and the best of intentions aren't enough to carry Robert the Bruce past its leaden pace and bland storytelling."

Accolades

See also 
 Outlaw King (2018) stars Chris Pine as Robert the Bruce, but depicts different events.

References

External links
 
 
 

2019 films
British drama films
British historical films
Robert the Bruce
Films shot in Montana
2010s English-language films
2010s British films